Xu Yi (徐儀; born 1963) is a Chinese-born French composer and music educator in France.

Early life 
In 1963, Xu was born in Nanjing, China.
Xu Yi began playing the Chinese violin, erhu, at a very young age.

Education 
Xu Yi was a student at the Shanghai Conservatory of Music, where she continued the violin, and later joined the class of composition.

After her arrival in France in 1988, she studied the Cursus of Composition and Computer Music of the IRCAM (1990/1991). She entered the Conservatory of Music of Paris, where she studied with Gérard Grisey and Ivo Malec.

Career 
At the age of 22, Xu became a teacher at the Shanghai Conservatory of Music.

Xu Yi won First Prize in composition in Conservatoire de Paris in 1994. She was the winner of the Prix de Rome, winning the honor of living in the Villa Medici in Rome from 1996 to 1998 (she was the first composer of Chinese origin to win this prize). Xu was professor of composition at the Cergy-Pontoise National Conservatory of Music (2001-2003). She is a distinguished Professor at the Shanghai Conservatory of Music. Currently, Xu lives in France and is a distinguished Professor at the Wuhan Conservatory of Music.

Xu Yi has received commissions from the French government, Radio France, and many festivals and ensembles. She has composed some 60 works, which have been performed at numerous festivals and broadcast in Europe, China, Japan, the US, Brazil and Canada. Several monographic concerts of Xu's music have been organized in France and in Italy. One monographic disc of her works (MFA-Radio France 1999) was distributed by Harmonia Mundi. Her work "Le Plein du Vide" was selected by the French Ministry of Education for the final high school music exam in 2006 and 2007. Many of her works are published by the music publishing House Henry Lemoine, in Paris.

Works

2023 "Ô silence", pour soprano, clarinette basse, alto et piano, Poème de Marie Closset

2022 "Cha ji / Wabi-sabi", for flute, clarinet, 2 percussions, violin and zheng (TimeArt studio commission)

2022 "Entre eux, entente à demi-mot" , pour mezzo-soprano, flûte, percussion, violon et violoncelle, poème de François Cheng

2021 "Dry in a storm", for mezzo-sprano (with percussions), Poems by Joyce Shintanin and by Emily Dickinson

2021 "Echo nocturne", for birbyne solo

2020 "To wait an hour-si long",for soprano, violon ans cello, 5 Poems (Quatrains) by Emily Dickinson (Radio France commission)

2020 "The Dust of time", for percussion

2020 “Self/nonself",for yunluo ( with one big cymbal)

2019 "Métamorphoses du serpent blanc", chamber opera (French State commissions), Laure Gauthier : Text and poem in French; Xu Yi : poems in chinese, for soprano, mezzo-soprano, maîtrise, little children's choir, 6 instruments and electronic device spatialized in multitrack

2019 "Qing yao", for Zheng solo (with qing) 

2018 "Two rotations" for alto and percussion

2018 "Ode aux nymphéas" miniature for string quartet (ProQuartet commission)

2018 "Saveur" for percussion and danse

2017 "Aquilone lontano" for string quartet (ProQuartet and Philharmonie de Paris commissions)

2017 " Résonance végétale" for cucurbit orchestra, video and electronics spatialised

2016 "Chu Feng" - Shangpian for xiao / xun, guqin, percussion, bianqing and bianzhong (2500 years old bronze chime)

2016 "Chu Feng" - Xiapian for di / xiao, shang bass, guzheng, pipa, 2 percussion, bianqing and bianzhong (2500 years old bronze chime)

2015 "Chant des muses" for soprano, 3 ténors, choir and 13 instruments

2015 "Bœuf ” for percussion solo

2014 "Empress Wu Zetian" Lyrical drama in 3 actes (French State commissions), livret : Agnès Marietta, for 3 singers, 1 actress-singer, young girls choir, 7 musicians and electronic device spatialized in multitrack

2014 "Ombres" for violon solo

2013 "La passion selon Médée" for 1 dancer, 1 flutist, 1 percussionist and one ensemble of 11 musicians

2012 "La joie du ciel" for 5 female voice a capella

2011 "Si He" for Qin, flute, cello and percussion

2010 "Zhiyin" for cello solo

2010 "Liao" for percussion solo

2010 "Le Ciel brûle" for mezzo-soprano and percussion

2009 "Qing" for alto solo (commissions of Pro Helvetia Switzerland)

2008 "Dan" for 6 instruments

2007 "Guo feng" for violin, cello, qin and electronics spatialised (French State commissions)

2006 "Cohésion" for clarinet, 4 saxophones, 6 brass and 7 groups of specialized children with the percussions

2005 "Tai" for Zheng and orchestra

2004 "Pipa yin" for 6 instruments

2004 "1+1=3" for 11 percussions (French State commissions)

2004 "Da Xu" for 6 instruments (Radio France commissions)

2003 "La divine" silent movie in concert, for silent film of Wu Yonggang, 10 instruments and electronics spatialised (ARTE commissions)

2002 "Voyage intérieur" for 6 instruments and electronics spatialised (French State commissions)

2002 "Variations sur le thème de Y.G.S.D" for pipa and 8 instruments

2001 "Dialogue d’amour" for soprano, choir of children and 13 instruments (Radio France commissions)

2001 "Tempête sur l’Asie" silent movie in concert, for silent film of Poudovkine, 7 musicians and electronics spatialised (Louvre commissions )

2000 "Da gui" in memory of Gérard Grisey, for flute, clarinete, percussion, violon et cello (French State commissions)

1999 "Crue d’automne" scenic poem, for 1 reciter, video, 6 musicians and electronics spatialised(French State commissions)

1997 "Le Plein du Vide" for 14 instruments and electronics spatialised (French State commissions)

1997 "Écho de la terre profonde" for 5 percussions

1997 "Tian yun" Melodrama, for 1 reciter and 8 instruments

1996 "Wou Wei" for bass flute and trumpet

1996 "Solo" for flûte solo

1996 "Xiao-yao-you" for 12 instruments and electronics spatialised

1995 "Gu yin" for flute and percussion (Radio France commissions)

1994 "Huntun" for 5 instrumental groups spatialised

1993 "Wang" for flute solo, string trio and percussion

1993 "Le Roi des arbres" spoken opera in 1 acte (3 tables), for a conductor, 3 comédians and 8 musiciens

1993 "Yi" for string trio

1992 "Miroir / poussière" for alto and 9 instruments

1991 "Tui" for bass and electronics

1991 "Tao1" for 6 instruments

1988 "Esprit poétique" for Erhu (violon chinois) and Chinese orchestra

1987 "Internal moving" for soprano, clarinete, alto and piano

1986 "Symphonietta" for orchestra

1985 "Temple Hanshan" for soprano and 3 Chinese instruments

1984 "Vallée vide" for Chinese flute, zheng and sets-gong

1982 "Small frogs" for ensemble of erhu (Chinese violin)

Discographie

2013 "Si He", "Si He" for Qin, flute, cello and percussion (9')

China Record Co. Shanghai

2005 "Tai", for Zheng and orchestra, (11')

Shanghai Conservatory of Music 2005

1999 "Le Plein du Vide", "Wang", "Yi", "Echo de la terre profonde", "Gu Yin", "Xiao-Yao-You"(70') Radio France / MFA / Villa Médicis 1999,

MFA 216032 HMCD 73.

1994 "Huntun"  (13') for 5 instrumental groups spatialised

Journées de la composition, CNSMP 1994.

1988 "Esprit poétique"1983-1988 (26')

for Erhu (violon chinois) and chinese orchestra

Fu Mao Record Co. Taiwan, 1988,

Fu jian Record Co. XCD-93014 / 1993, 1994.

1986 "Vallée vide" 1984 (7')

for Chinese flute, zheng and sets-gong

China Record Co. Shanghai, 1986.

1982 "Small frogs" for ensemble of erhu (Chinese violin)1982 (6')

for ensemble of erhu (Chinese violin), China Record Co. Shanghai, 1982.

References

External links
 Official site
 Le Plein du vide de Xu Yi
 

1963 births
Living people
Chinese emigrants to France
People's Republic of China composers
Chinese women classical composers
French women classical composers
Chinese music educators
French music educators
Conservatoire de Paris alumni
Shanghai Conservatory of Music alumni
Academic staff of Shanghai Conservatory of Music
Musicians from Nanjing
Educators from Nanjing
Chinese classical composers
Women music educators
20th-century women composers
20th-century classical composers